The Palm Multi-Connector (also Athena Connector) is a power, audio and data interface connector designed by Palm, Inc.

Use 
The connector is used by: LifeDrive, Tungsten E2, Tungsten T5, Treo 650, Treo 680, Treo 700p, Treo 750, Treo 755p, Palm TX, Palm Centro.

Changes
Palm, Inc. has changed the connectors it uses over time:

 some early models used model-specific connectors or Palm Serial.
 some models connected via Palm Universal Connector (Older Standard for Palm Handhelds, circa 2001-2004)
 some machines used a standard Mini USB (Some Low-Budget Handhelds)
 some machines used a Multi-Connector (Newer standard for palmOne and Palm Handhelds)

The Connector can be used to charge the device, transfer data to a computer, HotSync, and play audio. It is the new standard to replace the previous Palm Universal Connector, which performed similar functions but did not have an audio output capability.

This port has also been used to connect to an external microphone or to GPS units

Specification
The connector is divided in two sections: the longer one has thirteen pins numbered from right to left (5 to 17); the shorter one has three pins, on the left (3), top (2) and right (1). The cable shield connectors (4,18) are located on each side of the thirteen pins.

Pins 10 and 11 have TTL levels and cannot be directly connected to the RS-232 port.

Opinion
The Multi-Connector has received criticism from users who were familiar with previous connectors such as the Universal Connector. Users have been frustrated with the requirement to replace their Universal Connector cables, cradles, keyboards, sleds, and attachments as they have become incompatible. Another criticism is that the connector is fiddly, harder to remove and feels fragile.

All that is needed to charge the Treo is to connect +5 V to VDOCK and 0 V (negative) to VDOCK_RTN.

External links
 Palm Developer Guide, Palm OS Platform. Look at section 14 for Multi-connector pinout
 Palm Multi connector pinout
 Palm Developer Network

Palm OS devices